This article presents a list of the historical events and publications of Australian literature during 1979.

Events
 David Ireland won the 1979 Miles Franklin Award for A Woman of the Future

Major publications

Books 
 Gabrielle Carey and Kathy Lette – Puberty Blues
 David Ireland – A Woman of the Future
 Thomas Keneally – Confederates
 Roger McDonald – 1915: A Novel of Gallipoli
 Randolph Stow – The Visitants
 Patrick White – The Twyborn Affair

Short stories 
 Elizabeth Jolley – The Travelling Entertainer and Other Stories

Science Fiction and Fantasy 
 A. Bertram Chandler – Matilda's Stepchildren
 Anne Spencer Parry – The Crown of Darkness

Children's and Young Adult fiction 
 Mavis Thorpe Clark – The Lilly-Pilly
 Joan Phipson:
 No Escape
 Mr Pringle and the Prince

Poetry 
 Robert Adamson – Where I Come From
 Rosemary Dobson and David Campbell – Seven Russian Poets
 Robert Gray – Grass script
 Dorothy Hewett – Greenhouse
 Jennifer Maiden – The Border Loss
 Les Murray – The Boys Who Stole the Funeral
 John Tranter:
 Dazed in the Ladies Lounge
 Editor, The New Australian Poetry (anthology)
 Chris Wallace-Crabbe:
 The Emotions Are Not Skilled Workers
 Toil and Spin: Two Directions in Modern Poetry

Drama 
 Dorothy Hewett – The Man From Mukinupin
 Louis Nowra:
 The Lady of the Camellias
 Visions

Non-fiction 
 Terry Irving and Raewyn Connell, Class Structure in Australian History

Awards and honours

Order of Australia

 John Jefferson Bray appointed Companion of the Order of Australia (AC)
 Nancy Keesing appointed Member of the Order of Australia (AM)
 Douglas Stewart appointed Officer of the Order of Australia (AO)
 Judah Waten appointed Member of the Order of Australia (AM)

Lifetime achievement

Literary

Children and Young Adult

Poetry

Births 
A list, ordered by date of birth (and, if the date is either unspecified or repeated, ordered alphabetically by surname) of births in 1979 of Australian literary figures, authors of written works or literature-related individuals follows, including year of death.

 21 May – James Clancy Phelan, writer of thrillers and young adult novels
 6 June – Randa Abdel-Fattah, novelist

Unknown date
 Maxine Beneba Clarke, writer and slam poet
 Andrew Hutchinson, novelist

Deaths 
A list, ordered by date of death (and, if the date is either unspecified or repeated, ordered alphabetically by surname) of deaths in 1979 of Australian literary figures, authors of written works or literature-related individuals follows, including year of birth.

 29 July – David Campbell, poet (born 1915)
 6 March – Helen Palmer (publisher), socialist publisher (born 1917)
 6 June – Ion Idriess, writer (born 1889)
 13 August – F. J. Thwaites, novelist (born 1908)
 21 November – Marie Byles, travel writer and non-fiction writer (born 1900)
 8 December – Jennifer Rankin, poet and playwright (born 1941)

See also 
 1979 in Australia
 1979 in literature
 1979 in poetry
 List of years in literature
 List of years in Australian literature

References

 
Australian literature by year
20th-century Australian literature
1979 in literature